Sydney Lynn Carlin (born November 20, 1944) is a Democratic member of the Kansas House of Representatives, representing the 66th district. She has served since 2003. Carlin was challenged by Republican Lee Modisett in 2010 and 2012.

Carlin is a member of a number of community organizations, including the American Cancer Society, American Legion, Fraternal Order of Police, Habitat for Humanity, American Heart Association, and the Manhattan Arts Center.  Prior to being elected to the Kansas House, Carlin served on the Manhattan City Commission, 1993–97 and mayor of Manhattan, 1996-97.

Committee membership
 Appropriations
 Agriculture and Natural Resources Budget (Ranking Member)
 Agriculture and Natural Resources
 Joint Committee on Corrections and Juvenile Justice

References

External links
 Official Website
 Kansas Legislature - Sydney Carlin
 Project Vote Smart profile
 Kansas Votes profile
 State Surge - Legislative and voting track record

Democratic Party members of the Kansas House of Representatives
Women state legislators in Kansas
Politicians from Manhattan, Kansas
Living people
1944 births
21st-century American politicians
21st-century American women politicians
Women mayors of places in Kansas
Kansas State University alumni
Politicians from Wichita, Kansas